Leah Price (born October 6, 1970) is an American literary critic who specializes in the British novel and in the history of the book. She is Henry Rutgers Distinguished Professor in the Department of English at Rutgers University and founding director of the Rutgers Initiative for the Book. Prior to moving to Rutgers, Price was Professor of English and American Literature at Harvard University, where at the age of 31 she became one of the youngest assistant professors ever to be promoted to tenure at Harvard. She has written essays on old and new media for The New York Times Book Review, London Review of Books, The Paris Review, and The Boston Globe.

Education 
Price completed her undergraduate studies at Harvard University, graduating summa cum laude in 1991 with an A.B. in Literature. She was elected to Phi Beta Kappa and received a Hoopes Prize for her A.B. thesis.

In 1998, she earned her Ph.D. in Comparative Literature from Yale University. From 1997–2000 Price was a Research Fellow in English Literature at Girton College, Cambridge University.

Selected works
The Anthology and the Rise of the Novel (Cambridge University Press, 2000) 
Literary Secretaries/Secretarial Culture with Pamela Thurschwell (Routledge, 2005) 
Unpacking My Library: Writers and Their Books (Yale University Press, 2011) 
How to Do Things with Books in Victorian Britain (Princeton University Press, 2012) 
What We Talk About When We Talks About Books: The History and Future of Reading (Basic Books, 2019)

Personal life
Price is married to Rutgers bioethicist Nir M. Eyal, and they have one son and live in Princeton, New Jersey.

Price is since 2012 a member of Giving What We Can, a community of people who have pledged to give at least 10% of their income to effective charities.

See also
History of the Book
Victorian literature
Literary theory
Novel

References

External links
Rutgers Initiative for Book, Director's Page 
Public Books, Editor Profile 
Twitter feed 

Harvard University alumni
Fellows of Girton College, Cambridge
Harvard University faculty
Yale University alumni
Fellows of the National Endowment for the Humanities
Living people
1970 births
American academics of English literature